Gunnar Johansen (January 21, 1906, Copenhagen – May 25, 1991, Blue Mounds, Wisconsin) was a Danish-born pianist and composer. He was one of the chief proponents of the music of Ferruccio Busoni, whose mature keyboard works he recorded in their entirety, as well as the complete keyboard works of Johann Sebastian Bach.

Johansen was also a scholar, educator and humanist. His many humanitarian efforts included establishment of the Leonardo Academy, dedicated to the integration of the arts and sciences.

Biography
Born in Copenhagen, Johansen was introduced to the keyboard by his father and made his hometown debut at the age of twelve. Remaining in his native Denmark, he went on to study with the pianist and conductor Victor Schiøler. At the age of fourteen, he moved to Berlin to further his musical education with Egon Petri, a disciple of Ferruccio Busoni. He also worked with Edwin Fischer and Franz Liszt's pupil, Frederic Lamond. He toured as a pianist in Europe in the 1920s and came to the United States in 1929, first settling in California, where he did weekly radio performances for NBC Radio Network in San Francisco. He later taught for many years at the University of Wisconsin–Madison. Beginning his nearly four decade tenure there in 1939, Johansen has the distinction of being the first musical artist-in-residence at any university in the United States.

In the early 1940s, Johansen settled in Blue Mounds, Wisconsin, a small rural town approximately 25 miles west of Madison. It was here that many of his composing and recording projects took place.

Johansen died of liver cancer at the age of 85 at his home in Blue Mounds in 1991.

Recordings
Johansen was one of the first pianists to attempt to record all of Liszt's known piano music, researching and uncovering many previously unknown works in the 1960s. His recorded output of Liszt (which according to Johansen he "never intended to be absolutely complete") totals 51 LP records. The Australian born pianist Leslie Howard subsequently recorded 99 CDs, which is believed to account for Liszt's total keyboard production.

As a composer he was also prolific, with a catalogue of nearly 750 compositions in various forms: 31 piano sonatas, three piano concertos, three violin sonatas, a large 1937 work for orchestra (Variations, Disguises, and Fugue, on a Merry Theme of Cyrus McCormick), along with works for string quartet, oboe, and vocal ensembles.

References

External links
  (~1976)
  (WNCN-FM, 7-Dec-1979)
  (WNCN-FM, 15-May-1981)
  (WNCN-FM, 22-May-1981)
  (WNCN-FM, 29-May-1981)
  (WNCN-FM, 11-May-1976)

1906 births
1991 deaths
Danish classical pianists
American classical pianists
Male classical pianists
American male pianists
Danish music educators
American music educators
Piano pedagogues
Pupils of Egon Petri
20th-century classical pianists
20th-century classical musicians
20th-century American pianists
People from Blue Mounds, Wisconsin
20th-century American male musicians
20th-century American composers
Danish emigrants to the United States